Falmouth Smithick was an electoral division of Cornwall in the United Kingdom which returned one member to sit on Cornwall Council between 2013 and 2021. It was abolished at the 2021 local elections, being absorbed by Falmouth Arwenack and Falmouth Penwerris.

Councillors

Extent
Falmouth Smithick represented the centre of the town of Falmouth, including Kimberley Park. The division covered 70 hectares in total.

Election results

2018 by-election

2017 election

2013 election

References

Falmouth, Cornwall
Electoral divisions of Cornwall Council